"Alternative Roots" is an episode of the British comedy television series The Goodies.

This episode is also known as "The Goodies Find Their Roots" and "Hoots, Toots and Froots".

Written by The Goodies, with songs and music by Bill Oddie.

Prologue
During the episode, the Goodies also appear as their ancestors: 
 Tim Brooke-Taylor also appears as 'Kounty Kutie'
 Graeme Garden also appears as 'Keltic Kilty'
 Bill Oddie also appears as 'Kinda Kinky'

Plot
The Goodies tell of the time when their ancestors were young men, and how their ancestors met for the first time.

Graeme's family were Highlanders who lived in bleak conditions in Scotland, where initiation of the young men of the village included being dunked in porridge and catching a wild haggis.  Bill's West Country family sold fruit.  Tim, whose ancestors were also English, concludes that they were noble, because the family had its own Coat-of-Arms; Bill reinterprets the Coat of Arms and shows Tim that his ancestors were in fact sheep stealers.  None of the Goodies ancestors knew each other at this time.

Then, a bus went around the United Kingdom, taking up all of the young men of the villages — first of all Graeme's ancestor 'Keltic Kilty' was rounded up, with all of the other young men from his village — then Bill's ancestor 'Kinda Kinky' was rounded up,  with all of the other young men from his village — and, finally, Tim's ancestor 'Kounty Kutie' was rounded up, with all the other young men in the same sheep 'trade'.

All of the young men who had been captured were then put up for auction as entertainers, and eventually everyone had been bought — apart from 'Kounty Kutie', 'Keltic Kilty' and 'Kinda Kinky', who were forced to work together as entertainers, including on "The Black and White Minstrel Show". They rebel against being Minstrels, leading to hijinks as they are chased around the BBC. The network is so impressed they give the trio their own series.

Cultural references
 Roots
 The Black and White Minstrel Show

References

 "The Complete Goodies" — Robert Ross, B T Batsford, London, 2000
 "The Goodies Rule OK" — Robert Ross, Carlton Books Ltd, Sydney, 2006
 "From Fringe to Flying Circus — 'Celebrating a Unique Generation of Comedy 1960-1980'" — Roger Wilmut, Eyre Methuen Ltd, 1980
 "The Goodies — Fact File" — Matthew K. Sharp
 "The Goodies Episode Summaries" — Brett Allender

External links

The Goodies (series 7) episodes
1977 British television episodes